Susan Bloch could refer to:

Susan Bloch (1940–1982), American theatrical press agent
Susan Low Bloch, American professor of Constitutional law and communications law

See also
Susan Block (born 1955), American sex therapist
Suzanne Bloch (1907–2002), Swiss-American musician, daughter of Ernst Bloch
Portrait of Suzanne Bloch (1904), operatic singer painted by Picasso